Paul Ross Thomson (born 18 February 1972 in Walsall, Staffordshire) is an English composer for film, television, and video games and music technologist who lives in the Cotswolds. He won the 2012 Royal Television Society Craft & Design Award for Music Original Title for his theme music The Fades featured on BBC's cult series.

Spitfire Audio
He founded the British music technology company Spitfire Audio with fellow composer Christian Henson in 2007. The company has become the pre-eminent producer of musical Virtual Instruments Worldwide, having collaborated with noted film composer Hans Zimmer, Chad Smith (Red Hot Chili Peppers), Olafur Arnalds, Roger Taylor (Queen), Eric Whitacre, BT, posthumously with the legendary explorer and musician David Fanshawe and most recently with the BBC Symphony Orchestra.

Television
Thomson has written for a variety of films and television shows.

Recent work also includes the multiple award winning movie Missed Connections, the film adaptation of Half of a Yellow Sun, the BAFTA Best Drama winning and BANFF Best Youth Fiction award winning The Fades (2011), Discovery: Project Earth (2008) and The Genius of Charles Darwin (2008).

Games
Thomson was a lead composer on LittleBigPlanet 2 created by Media Molecule creating all of the cinematics for the game, and several adaptive music tracks. He also worked with the company on the first game's downloadable content, scoring the Pirates of the Caribbean premium level pack and the "Marvel" premium level pack.
He has also worked on LittleBigPlanet Karting, LittleBigPlanet Vita, and most recently, LittleBigPlanet 3.

References

External links
 
 

1972 births
English television composers
English male composers
Living people
People from Walsall
English film score composers
English male film score composers

de:Paul Thomson
fr:Paul Thomson
pt:Paul Thomson
simple:Paul Thomson